Davor Kukec (born 16 March 1986) is a Croatian professional footballer who plays as a midfielder for Austrian club ASKÖ Oedt.

Honours
Šibenik
 Croatian Second League: 2019–20

References

External links
 

1986 births
Living people
Footballers from Zagreb
Association football midfielders
Croatian footballers
Croatia under-21 international footballers
NK Inter Zaprešić players
Panionios F.C. players
FC Baník Ostrava players
FK Teplice players
1. FK Příbram players
HNK Šibenik players
First Football League (Croatia) players
Croatian Football League players
Super League Greece players
Czech First League players
Austrian Landesliga players
Croatian expatriate footballers
Expatriate footballers in Greece
Croatian expatriate sportspeople in Greece
Expatriate footballers in the Czech Republic
Croatian expatriate sportspeople in the Czech Republic
Expatriate footballers in Austria
Croatian expatriate sportspeople in Austria